Mera is a commune in Romania. It is located in Vrancea County. It is composed of five villages: Livada, Mera, Milcovel, Roșioara, and Vulcăneasa.

Demographics 
According to the 2011 National Census data, the commune has 3,453 inhabitants, in decline from 2002, when the census registered 3,914 people.

History 
In Mera lies the former Mera monastery, considered a historical monument of national interest. Built in 1685, it is the only religious edifice built by the Moldavian voivode Constantin Cantemir. The complex contains the "Holy Emperors" church, the exterior wall, and administrative buildings.

References

Communes in Vrancea County
Localities in Western Moldavia